Bayırköy is a town (belde) and municipality in the Bilecik District, Bilecik Province, Turkey. Its population is 1,793 (2021). Bayırköy consists of the quarters Fatih, Gazi and Sarmaşık.

The town has been relocated in 1948 to its present location after a landslide in its former location slightly at the west. The economy of the town depends on vegetable farming and sericulture. There are also some factories around the town.

References

Populated places in Bilecik District
Towns in Turkey